Diary of a Butterfly is a 2012 thriller drama film directed by Vinod Mukhi and written by Asad Ajmeri. The film stars Udita Goswami as a female protagonist.
The film is produced by Anil Kumar under the banner of Bhaggyashri Production.

Story
This is a story  about a girl named Gul, who starts her journey for success from her hometown Jaipur. She is hungry for success so she decides to go to the city of dreams, Mumbai. When she is leaving for Mumbai, her mother gives her a Diary. She says to Gul that it will be very helpful if she records her day-to-day activities in the Diary. She also gives her a Note, on which there are some knowledgeable lines written.

In Mumbai she works for a Fashion House. She stays with her friends Piya, who works as an accountant in the same Fashion House, and with Carol, who is an owner of a Spa.

When she starts her journey in Mumbai she forgets each and every relationship in the thirst for success. She uses people as stairs in her journey of life in order to reach to the top. She even takes the Diary and the Note as a joke. But when she reaches the peak, she finds out that while running for success she has hurt many people knowingly or sometimes even without any intention. She had abused many people who tried to correct her and now currently she has nobody to celebrate her newfound success. Her errant and reckless lifestyle and line approach to achieve her goal made her lose every friend in life.

So she starts reading her Diary from the start just to find out if she has treated someone to the worst degree. Also the Notes Lines starts ringing in her head helping her realize her mistakes and also telling her to apologize to them.

When she decides to correct all the mistakes she has made in the past i.e. to apologize to each and everyone she has hurt, she finds out the truth about Mumbai and the Corporate World. She is so shocked seeing the response of the people that she decides to stay the way she is. She also refuses to listen to her Mother because she thinks because of the Diary and the Note she went to correct things which in-turn became a joke on herself.

Arrogant, Reckless, Social and a Dreamer who will continue her journey for more success but in her own way.

Cast
 Udita Goswami as Gul
 Rati Agnihotri as Shobha
 Sofia Hayat as Carol
 Aryan Vaid as Ravi Bajaj
 Ronny Jhutti as Adi
 Rajesh Khattar as Xavier
 Rajeev Singh as Aran
 Harsh Chhaya as Vivek
 Naseer Abdullah as Gul’s father
 Gaurav Dixit as Aakash
 Sneha Belani as Pia
 Johnny Nirmal as Delete Singh

Soundtrack
Music of the film is composed by Mukhtar Sahota, Taz – Stereonation, and Shibani Kashyap, whereas the lyrics have been penned down by Arif Lohar, Arko and Virag Mishra. The singers are lined up as Taz – Stereonation, Arif Lohar, Shibani Kashyap, Vasuda Sharma, Akriti Kakkar & Apeksha Dandekar.

Reception
The film opened to negative reviews. Faisal Saif of Global Movie magazine gave 1 out of 5 stars and wrote "Painful experience sleaze fest filled with extremely bad performances". DNA India wrote "Doesn't seem completely devoid and potential". Komal Nahta of koimoi.com gave 1/2 star out of 5 and wrote "Apology of a story, Below the mark performance".

References

External links
 
 

2012 films
2010s Hindi-language films
2012 thriller drama films
Indian thriller drama films
Films scored by Shibani Kashyap
2012 drama films